The Sakharov Prize for Freedom of Thought, commonly known as the Sakharov Prize, is an honorary award for individuals or groups who have dedicated their lives to the defence of human rights and freedom of thought. Named after Russian scientist and dissident Andrei Sakharov, the prize was established in December 1988 by the European Parliament.  

A shortlist of nominees is drawn up annually by the European Parliament's Committee on Foreign Affairs and Committee on Development. The MEPs who make up those committees then select a shortlist in September. Thereafter, the final choice is given to The European Parliament's Conference of Presidents (President and political group's leaders) and the laureate's name is announced late in October. The prize is awarded in a ceremony at the Parliament's Strasbourg hemicycle (round chamber) in December. The prize includes a monetary award of €50,000.

The first prize was awarded jointly to South African Nelson Mandela and Russian Anatoly Marchenko. The 1990 award was given to Aung San Suu Kyi, but she could not receive it until 2013 as a result of her political imprisonment in Burma. The prize has also been awarded to organisations, the first being the Argentine Mothers of the Plaza de Mayo in 1992. Five Sakharov laureates were subsequently awarded the Nobel Peace Prize: Nelson Mandela, Aung San Suu Kyi, Malala Yousafzai, Denis Mukwege and Nadia Murad.

Razan Zaitouneh (2011) was kidnapped in 2013 and is still missing.  Nasrin Sotoudeh (2012) was released from prison in September 2013,  but is still barred from leaving Iran, along with fellow 2012 laureate Jafar Panahi.  The 2017 prize was awarded to the Democratic Opposition in Venezuela, under boycott of the European United Left–Nordic Green Left.

Laureates

Table notes

References

External links

 
 

 
Awards established in 1988
European human rights awards
European Parliament
Free expression awards